DI Ray is a British police procedural television series created and written by Maya Sondhi and produced by Jed Mercurio. The first of its four episodes aired on ITV on 2 May 2022.

DI Ray stars Parminder Nagra in the title role as a Detective Inspector in a fictitious Birmingham-based police force. The cast also includes Gemma Whelan and Jamie Bamber.

The series was filmed during October and November 2021 in locations including Birmingham's Jewellery Quarter and outside  Lloyd House police station.

In November 2022, it was announced that the series was renewed for a six-episode second series, which will begin filming in 2023.

Cast
 Parminder Nagra as DI Rachita Ray
 Gemma Whelan as DCI Kerry Henderson
 Jamie Bamber as DCI Martyn Hunter
 Sam Baker-Jones as DC Liam Payne
 Maanuv Thiara as PS Tony Khatri
 Jessica Temple as DC Carly Lake

Critical response
Lucy Mangan, writing for The Guardian, gave the series three out of a possible five stars. She praised Sondhi's use of "tangled motivations that hold the viewers' interest" to create a "police procedural with a fresh perspective" but felt that the story "at times moves a bit too slowly" and "feels a bit too by-numbers". Sean O'Grady for The Independent gave the series four stars out of five, describing the lead character as "a smart, sassy, tough telly detective" and summarising "low key in tone and atmosphere, DI Ray, cop and show, that is, deserves to be a success. Mercurio ticks another box."

At the conclusion of the broadcasting of the final episode, it remained unclear whether or not DI Ray will return for a future series. Mercurio said: "We'd all be thrilled if we got the opportunity to do more."

References

External links

2022 British television series debuts
2020s British crime drama television series
2020s British mystery television series
2020s British police procedural television series
2020s British workplace drama television series
English-language television shows
Television shows set in Birmingham, West Midlands